Saturday Disney was a New Zealand Saturday morning children's series. The last episode aired in 2006, with Studio 2 taking on the Saturday show, called Studio 2 Saturday which finished later that year.

New Zealand children's television series
2004 New Zealand television series debuts
2006 New Zealand television series endings
TVNZ original programming